Eero Johannes Kolehmainen (24 March 1918 – 7 December 2013) was a Finnish cross-country skier. He competed in the 50 km event at the 1952 and 1956 Olympics and won a silver medal in 1952, placing fourth in 1956. In 1957, aged 39, he won the 50 km races at the Holmenkollen ski festival and Lahti Ski Games. The same year, he was awarded the Holmenkollen medal. Kolehmainen's best finish at the FIS Nordic World Ski Championships was fifth over 50 km in 1958. He was a farmer by occupation.

Cross-country skiing results
All results are sourced from the International Ski Federation (FIS).

Olympic Games
 1 medal – (1 silver)

World Championships

References

External links

 – click Holmenkollmedaljen for downloadable pdf file 
 – click Vinnere for downloadable pdf file 
Report on Eero Kolehmainen's 90th birthday 

1918 births
2013 deaths
People from Mikkeli
Olympic cross-country skiers of Finland
Cross-country skiers at the 1952 Winter Olympics
Olympic silver medalists for Finland
Finnish male cross-country skiers
Holmenkollen medalists
Holmenkollen Ski Festival winners
Cross-country skiers at the 1956 Winter Olympics
Olympic medalists in cross-country skiing
Medalists at the 1952 Winter Olympics
Sportspeople from South Savo